Nabil Al-Awadi (born 7 February 1970) is a Kuwaiti writer, humanitarian, television presenter, university professor, journalist, orator, and he is a Muslim scholar. He had his bachelor's degree in education from the Kuwait University. He traveled to UK to pursue his post-graduate studies and he earned a master's degree in education.

Until February 2013 he was director of the independent Al-Birr Primary School in Birmingham, England.

TV and social media 
He made hundreds of series or lectures on different TV channels, such as Iqraa TV, Alrai TV.

Part of his TV Series:
 Faithfully Quotes (قبسات ايمانية), on Al Resalah TV, 2014.
 Best of the stories ( أروع القصص ), on Al Resalah TV, 2009.
 Honestly Hour ( ساعة صراحة ), on Al Watan TV, & Alrai TV , 2006–2007.
 Honestly ( بكل صراحة ), on Al-Watan TV, 2007 – 2010.
 Stories of the Prophets peace be upon them ( قصص الأنبياء عليهم السلام ), on Al Watan TV, 2007 .
 I knew my way (عرفت طريقي), at 2010 .
 The story of Alfaruk (قصة الفاروق   ), on MBC1 TV , 2012.
 Corners (زوايا) on Al Watan TV, 2010 – 2012 .
 Prophetic Biography (السيرة النبوية), on Al Watan TV, 2008.
 Virtues (فضائل), on 2010.
 Scenes "season 1" .
 Scenes "season 2" .
 Scenes "season 3" .
 Scenes "season 4" , on Rotana Khalijia.
 Sawâ'Id Al Ikhâa, (  سواعد الإخاء ), on Al Resalah TV, Iqra, 4Shabab TV .
 Oh Allah, (يا الله), on Almajd TV Network .
 Are they equal? (هل يستويان) . in 2015 .

Social media 
On Twitter he has over 11.1 million followers. And over one million subscribers on YouTube.

Temporary revocation of citizenship
In August 2014 Kuwait revoked his citizenship temporarily for "security reasons", based on article 13 of the Kuwati citizenship law. Andrew Gilligan, of the Sunday Telegraph, suggested the revocation was because Al Awadi was a "terror funder". Citizenship was reinstated in 2018.

See also

 Islam in Kuwait
 Tareq Al-Suwaidan
 Al-Resalah Satellite TV

References

External links
 
 
 

Living people
Kuwaiti television presenters
Kuwaiti Muslims
Kuwaiti imams
1970 births
Kuwaiti activists
Kuwaiti writers
21st-century Kuwaiti writers